Alessandro Rossi may refer to:
Alessandro Rossi (bishop of Parma) (1555–1615), Italian Roman Catholic bishop
Alessandro Rossi (bishop of Ariano) (1589–1656), Italian Roman Catholic bishop
Alessandro Rossi (textile industrialist) (1819–1898), Italian industrialist of Schio, Veneto
Alessandro Rossi (Captains Regent) (born 1967), Captains Regent of San Marino
Alessandro Rossi (footballer) (born 1997), Italian footballer